Sloughhouse or Slough House may refer to:

 Sloughhouse AVA, a wine region in California
 Sloughhouse, California, an unincorporated community in Sacramento County
 Slough House, a fictional office location in Slow Horses, a British TV spy thriller